John Conway (also known by his Irish name Sean Ó Conbhuí) is a former Gaelic footballer from County Laois.

Biography 
He formerly played in defence for Laois and in 1968 (along with his brother JJ) was part of the Laois team that lost the Leinster Senior Football Championship final to Longford.

References

Year of birth missing (living people)
Living people
Arles-Kilcruise Gaelic footballers
Laois inter-county Gaelic footballers